Le Volcan interdit is a 1966 French documentary film directed by Haroun Tazieff. It was nominated for an Academy Award for Best Documentary Feature.
The film is set in Zaire, following an expedition exploring the crater of the Niragongo volcano of the Virunga chain, whose eruptions are known for their violence and their massive lava flows.

References

External links

1966 films
1966 documentary films
1960s French-language films
French documentary films
Documentary films about nature
1960s French films